Nathan Goff Jr. (February 9, 1843 – April 23, 1920) was a United States representative from West Virginia, a Union Army officer, the 28th United States Secretary of the Navy during President Rutherford B. Hayes administration, a United States circuit judge of the United States Court of Appeals for the Fourth Circuit and of the United States Circuit Courts for the Fourth Circuit and a United States senator from West Virginia.

Early life and education

Born on February 9, 1843, in Clarksburg, Harrison County, Virginia (now West Virginia), to Waldo Goff, who had five times won election to represent Harrison County in the Virginia House of Delegates. Goff attended the Northwestern Academy in Clarksburg and Georgetown University in Washington, D.C. He received a Bachelor of Laws in 1866 from New York University School of Law.

American Civil War
Although his family owned several slaves, they favored the Union. During the American Civil War, Goff joined the Union Army in 1861; enlisting in the 3rd West Virginia Infantry Regiment. He later became a major in the 4th West Virginia Cavalry Regiment.

Postwar career
Goff became editor of the Clarksburg Telegraph beginning in 1866. Admitted to the bar, he began his private legal practice in Clarksburg from 1866 to 1867. He won election to the West Virginia House of Delegates from 1867 to 1868.

Goff then became the United States Attorney for the District of West Virginia from 1868 to 1881, and from 1881 to 1882. He served as the 28th United States Secretary of the Navy in 1881.

However, Goff failed to win election to Congress as a Republican candidate in 1870 and 1874. He was also the Republican candidate for Governor of West Virginia in 1876 and 1888, but voters instead elected the Democrat.

United States representative 

Goff was elected as a Republican from West Virginia's 1st congressional district to the United States House of Representatives of the 48th, 49th and 50th United States Congresses, serving from March 4, 1883, to March 3, 1889. He was not a candidate for renomination. Following his departure from Congress, Goff resumed private practice in Clarksburg from 1889 to 1892.

Federal judicial service

Goff was nominated by President Benjamin Harrison on December 16, 1891, to the United States Court of Appeals for the Fourth Circuit and the United States Circuit Courts for the Fourth Circuit, to a new joint seat authorized by 26 Stat. 826. He was confirmed by the United States Senate on March 17, 1892, and received his commission the same day. On December 31, 1911, the Circuit Courts were abolished and he thereafter served only on the Court of Appeals. His service terminated on March 31, 1913, due to his resignation.

United States senator 

Goff was elected as a Republican to the United States Senate for the term commencing March 4, 1913, but did not immediately take his seat, preferring to remain on the federal bench, and served from April 1, 1913, to March 3, 1919. He was not a candidate for reelection in 1918. He was Chairman of the Committee on Conservation of Natural Resources for the 65th United States Congress and Chairman of the Committee on Industrial Expositions for the 65th United States Congress.

Death

Goff died on April 23, 1920, in Clarksburg. He was interred in Odd Fellows Cemetery in Clarksburg. He was the last surviving member of the Hayes Cabinet.

Family

Goff was the father of West Virginia United States Senator Guy D. Goff and grandfather of United States Representative from Tennessee Louise Goff Reece.

Home

Goff's home at Clarksburg, the Nathan Goff Jr. House, was listed on the National Register of Historic Places in 1976. It was delisted in 1994, after demolition in 1993.

Namesake

The World War II destroyer  was named in his honor.

References

Sources

External links
The West Virginia & Regional History Center at West Virginia University houses the papers of Nathan Goff Jr. in three collections, A&M 213, A&M 953, and A&M 1940

 USS Goff (DD-247), Dictionary of American Naval Fighting Ships  - Naval Historical Center
 

1843 births
1920 deaths
Politicians from Clarksburg, West Virginia
United States Secretaries of the Navy
Hayes administration cabinet members
Republican Party members of the United States House of Representatives from West Virginia
Republican Party United States senators from West Virginia
Judges of the United States Court of Appeals for the Fourth Circuit
United States Attorneys for the District of West Virginia
United States federal judges appointed by Benjamin Harrison
19th-century American judges
19th-century American lawyers
20th-century American lawyers
19th-century American politicians
West Virginia lawyers
People of West Virginia in the American Civil War
Southern Unionists in the American Civil War
Military personnel from Clarksburg, West Virginia
Union Army officers
Lawyers from Clarksburg, West Virginia